National Orthopaedic Hospital, Dala is a federal government of Nigeria speciality hospital located in Dala, Kano State, Nigeria. The current chief medical director is Mohammad Nuhu Salihu.

History 
National Orthopaedic Hospital, Dala was established in 1959.

CMD 
The current chief medical director is Mohammad Nuhu Salihu.

References 

Hospitals in Nigeria